This is list of earthquakes in South Korea. Earthquakes in South Korea are less frequent than in neighboring countries, such as China and Japan.

Earthquakes 
Significant earthquakes have occurred in South Korean prior to the 20th century.

  : approx. Mw 6.7–7.0, Speculated max. intensity IX. More than 100 people died and many houses collapsed. This is deadliest recorded earthquake in South Korea.
 1518 Seoul earthquake : approx. Mw 6.7, Speculated max. intensity IX.
 1643 Ulsan earthquake : approx. Mw 6.7–7.4, Speculated max. intensity IX–X. Tsunami occurred.
  : approx. Mw 7.5, Speculated max. intensity IX. Tsunami occurred. Most powerful earthquake in South Korea all over its history.

1978 and later 

This is a part of list of earthquakes in South Korea equal or stronger than 5.0 ML since 1978.

References

South Korea
Earthquakes
Earthquakes in South Korea